Admiral Pellew may refer to:

Edward Pellew, 1st Viscount Exmouth (1757–1833), British Royal Navy admiral
Fleetwood Pellew (1789–1861), British Royal Navy admiral
Israel Pellew (1758–1832), British Royal Navy admiral